Patrick Henry O'Loughlin was an Irish born 19th-century outfielder who played in Major League Baseball. Sometimes credited as Patrick Loughlin or simply "Loughlin", he appeared in one game at right field for the 1883 Baltimore Orioles of the American Association. In that game, he got two hits in five at bats.

Sources
 Patrick O'Loughlin at Baseball Reference
 Patrick Loughlin at Retrosheet

Irish emigrants to the United States (before 1923)
Major League Baseball players from Ireland
Irish baseball players
Major League Baseball right fielders
Baltimore Orioles (AA) players
1860 births
1927 deaths
19th-century baseball players